Living Energy Farm, or "LEF", is a zero fossil fuel intentional community of seven adult members plus two children (as of 2022) on 127 acres in rural Louisa County, Virginia, United States. The farm is an Ally Community with the Federation of Egalitarian Communities. It is nine miles from Twin Oaks Community, which helped support LEF when it was being founded.

Community 

LEF is an intentional community, organic farm and environmental educational center founded in 2010. The community is off the grid and grows most of its food. The membership is income sharing, and supports itself financially by growing seeds and processing sweet potato slips for Southern Exposure Seed Exchange.

As an environmental education center, LEF's mission is to demonstrate a way of life that is both sustainable and accessible to the majority of humanity that is not wealthy. To that end, LEF has developed a solar powered DC Microgrid that supplies basic domestic energy needs at a fraction of the cost of typical AC based off-grid solar systems. 

In 2020 LEF launched a business, Living Energy Lights, which sells daylight drive appliances and battery systems.

In addition to its pioneering work on DC energy systems, LEF employs many other "green" technologies such as strawbale insulation, passive and active solar heating, composting toilets, biogas production for cooking fuel.

DC Microgrid 

The DC Microgrid developed at LEF uses daylight drive (wiring DC motors and other appliances directly to PV panels), thermal storage, and insulation to provide off-grid domestic energy services at low cost by avoiding the use of batteries and inverters for heavy energy loads such as refrigeration, cooking, heating and cooling, and motors. Power for lights and smaller loads like electronics are provided by 12V DC nickel iron battery systems. 

The community has been central to the development and testing of Insulated Solar Electric Cookers in cooperation with Cal Poly University.

Outreach 
LEF works to promote and establish daylight drive DC Microgrids in low income communities where grid power is inaccessible or unreliable. In 2019 and 2020, crews from LEF installed 12V battery kits for 50 homes in the Dine and Hopi Reservations. Since 2021, they have been working with The Source Farm and Ecovillage in Jamaica to establish a daylight drive food processing facility. They are also working with organizations in Puerto Rico to establish a DC Microgrid demonstration center around Mayaguez.

References

External links
 The Living Energy Farm
 The Federation of Egalitarian Communities
 Virginia Organizing - LEF
 The Fellowship for Intentional Community Directory
 Back to the Future - LEF unites community living with sustainability - Transition voices

Utopian communities
Rural community development
Populated places in Louisa County, Virginia
Unincorporated communities in Virginia